Orthomegas irroratus is a species of beetle in the family Cerambycidae. It is found in Colombia.

Description 
The average length of the Orthomegas irroratus is 62.7 to 65.2 millimetres long. The colour is usually dark-brown or reddish brown. The area behind its eyes are reddish yellow, along with its seta.

References

Beetles described in 1915
Prioninae